The 1949 Connecticut Huskies football team represented the University of Connecticut in the 1949 college football season.  The Huskies were led by 15th-year head coach J. Orlean Christian and completed the season with a record of 4–4–1.

Schedule

References

Connecticut
UConn Huskies football seasons
Yankee Conference football champion seasons
Connecticut Huskies football